Herta may refer to the following:

Given name
 Herta Anitaș (born 1967) Romanian rower and Olympic medalist
 Herta Bothe (born 1921), German guard at Nazi concentration camps
 Herta Däubler-Gmelin (born 1943), German politician, German Minister of Justice
 Herta Ehlert (1905–1997), German guard at many Nazi concentration camps
 Herta Elviste (1923-2016), Estonian actress 
 Herta Feely (born ????), German-American editor, and child safety activist
 Herta Freitag (1908–2000), Austrian-born American mathematician and professor
 Herta Groves, British hat designer
 Herta Haas (1914–2010), Yugoslav Partisan during World War II and second wife of Josip Broz Tito
 Herta Hafner, Italian luger
 Herta Herzog (1910–2010), Austrian-born American social scientist specializing in communication studies
 Herta Heuwer (1913–1999), German inventor of the take-out dish currywurst
 Herta Huber (born 1926), German writer and poet
 Herta Laipaik (1921–2008), Estonian writer
 Herta Müller (born 1953), Romanian-born German novelist, poet, essayist and recipient of the 2009 Nobel Prize in Literature
 Herta Oberheuser (1911–1978), German physician at the Ravensbrück concentration camp
 Herta Ratzenhofer (born 1921), Austrian pair skater and Olympic competitor
 Herta Ware (1917–2005), American actress and political activist
 Herta Wunder (1913–1992), German freestyle swimmer and Olympic competitor

Surname
 Bryan Herta (born 1970), American race car driver
 Colton Herta (born 2000), American race car driver, son of Bryan Herta
 Teodor Herța, Bessarabian politician

Locations
 Herța River, a tributary of the Prut River in Romania
 Hertsa, a city located in Chernivtsi Oblast in western Ukraine
 The Hertsa region, a former Romanian region, now in Ukraine, occupied in 1940 by the Soviet Union as a result of Molotov-Ribbentrop Pact

Other uses
 Herta Foods, brand of pre-cooked Frankfurters, owned by Nestlé
 "Herta", a type of drum rudiment

See also
 Hertha (disambiguation)
 Herța (disambiguation)

Estonian feminine given names
German feminine given names